Navy Spy is a 1937 American thriller film directed by Joseph H. Lewis and Crane Wilbur and starring Conrad Nagel, Eleanor Hunt and Judith Allen. It was one of a series of four films featuring Nagel as a federal agent released by Grand National Pictures.

Plot
A federal agent tackles a gang of international criminals attempting to sabotage the American navy.

Cast
 Conrad Nagel as Alan O'Connor  
 Eleanor Hunt as Bobbie Reynolds  
 Judith Allen as Anna Novna  
 Jack Doyle as Lt. Don Carrington  
 Phil Dunham as Dr. Matthews  
 Don Barclay as Bertie  
 Howard Lang as Barradine  
 Crauford Kent as Capt. Leeds

References

Bibliography
 Backer, Ron. Mystery Movie Series of 1930s Hollywood. McFarland, 2012.

External links
 

1937 films
1930s thriller films
1930s English-language films
American thriller films
Films directed by Joseph H. Lewis
Films directed by Crane Wilbur
Grand National Films films
American black-and-white films
1930s American films